Stanisław Pawlusiak (born 30 April 1958) is a Polish ski jumper. He competed in the normal hill and large hill events at the 1980 Winter Olympics.

References

1958 births
Living people
Polish male ski jumpers
Olympic ski jumpers of Poland
Ski jumpers at the 1980 Winter Olympics
People from Bielsko County
20th-century Polish people